Libys is a genus of coelacanth lobe-finned fish in the family of Latimeridae. Species of Libys lived during the Upper Jurassic period (Kimmeridgian - Tithonian, about 150 to 145 million years ago).

Description
Libys had an exceptionally squat body, especially when compared to other coelacanths of the same period as Undina and Holophagus. Libys could reach 60 centimeters in length and was therefore a medium-sized coelacanth, with a short and high skull. The pectoral fins were quite long, while the tail was remarkably short and high

Distribution
Fossils of these fishes have been found in Germany, in the famous deposits of Solnhofen.

Species
 Libys superbus Reis, 1888
 Libys polypterus

The genus Libys was erected  in 1842 by Muenster. The species Libys polypterus was then established as the type species, on the basis of fragmentary remains. A second species, L. superbus, was described on the basis of complete large specimens, but most authors treat both as one species.

References
Biolib
The Paleobiology Database
Paul H. LAMBERS A redescription of the coelacanth Macropoma willemoesii VETTER from the lithographic limestone of Solnhofen (Upper Jurassic, Bavaria)
History of the Coelacanth Fishes by Peter L. Forey, Chapman & Hall, 1998.
von Dr. Peter Wellnhofer Der Quastenflosser Latimeria - ein "lebendes Fossil"

Latimeriidae
Prehistoric lobe-finned fish genera
Jurassic bony fish
Jurassic fish of Europe
Fossil taxa described in 1842